The Ministry of Health and Medical Services (MHMS) (in Gilbertese, Botaki n Mwakuri ibukin te Mauri ao Katoki Aoraki) is a governmental ministry of Kiribati. It is partnered with the World Bank, Unicef, Australian Aid, UNFPA, and New Zealand Foreign Affairs and Trade.

Ministers
 Tekarei Russell (1975–1977)
 Abete Merang (1979–1982) for Health and Community Affairs
 Natanaera Kirata (2003–2007)
 Dr Kautu Tenaua (2007–2016)
 Kobebe Taitai (2016–2018)
 Tauanei Marea (2018–2020)
 Dr Tinte Itinteang (2020–)

References

External links
 Ministry of Health and Medical Services

Kiribati
Government of Kiribati